Talakag, officially the Municipality of Talakag (Bukid and Higaonon: Banuwa ta Talakag;), is a 1st class municipality in the province of Bukidnon, Philippines. According to the 2020 census, it has a population of 77,027 people.

It is located on the border to major cities of Cagayan de Oro and Iligan, and between Marawi and Malaybalay, the provincial capital.

Etymology
Once in the not so distant past, a nomadic tribe wandered down south. Finally, they settled upon a place attuned to their needs and liking. The place, was traversed by a zigzagging creek swollen with clear sparkling water where on its banks grew in abundance wild Malayan trees called “Balangas” (now popularly known as Rambutan – Nephelium lappaceum of the Family: Sapindaceae). The trees were full of attractive bloody red but juicy and delicious fruits, clustered in their very green foliages. Because of fanatical attachment of this tribe to these balangas trees, they decided to name their settlement  “Kabalangasan” - a very typical way of simply affixing prefixes. This is the original name of the municipality of Talakag.

However, names of places are, often, influenced and affected by events that revolve around it. History goes that aside from this Kabalangasan settlement, there was another settlement further down south called “Dagundalahon”. At first, tribes of both settlements were very friendly and cordial to each other.  They would hold social gatherings, "Kaamulan" and 'Kaliga" and other forms of intimate social merry-makings to satisfy their whims and caprices often with paganic undertones.

This relationship did not last long. A serious breakdown developed and as a consequence, they became bitter enemies. The root cause was the intense rivalry of men/warriors over beautiful and alluring women from either side. This resulted and accounted for ambush, kidnappings and to some extent even killings.

It was on the Kabalangasan side that men are more daring and aggressive. They adopted and ventured into the “go-chase-kidnap” tactics preying on the women of Dagundalahon who caught their fancy.  Because of these, hill tribes in Dagundalahon side renamed “Kabalangasan” to Talakag,  the etymology of which came from the Visayan dialect- LAKAG meaning  "to go after” or “follow in pursuit” and the prefix “TA” denoting “fondness in doing such”. In other words, Talakag means “fondness in giving pursuit”.

Thus, the settlement that was known as Kabalangasan was named Talakag while the creek traversing the place retained the name Kabalangasan.

History
In the late 15th Century, the seat of the highland government was established in Kinolosanglay at Tikalaan headed by Datu Man-utob, a wise and brave ruler. The Datu was described as an imposing giant of a man who has a big mole at the center of his nose bridge. His court was composed of Datu Aliga, Datu Lumbac and Datu Limbubongan (descent from Sharif Alawi). His ambassador was Datu Malinkayao, who was also called Sumagayon.

The jurisdiction of the kingdom of Datu Man-utob embraced the areas of Cosina, which was ruled by Mansalingay;  Dagundalahon which was ruled by Datu Manlugwas;  Langawon under the rule of Datu Mantingal;  Landang, ruled by Datu Mancabo;  Alanib ( now of Lantapan, Bukidnon) under the rules of Datu Malongmong and Datu Manbailana; Mandugao and Salagapon, which was ruled by Datu Tomopa; Tapagkal, ( now of Pangantukan, Bukidnon) ruled by Datu Magayao, Datu Maka-andig, Datu Dupao and Datu Miaday;  Damulog which was ruled by Datu Labawan, who was also called Maganuna; Macahambus which was ruled by Datu Manpaklawan; and Tumalaung, which was ruled by Datu Mambalintas and Datu Manbalagon.

Datu Man-utob was such a respected ruler that all the datus under him were all in awe of him. Even the Datus of Cagayhaan (now Cagayan de Oro) ruled by Datus Abaga, Binandina and Ganza, Datus Tombalan, Mansingkatol, Manimohod, Mansihabo, Tingkayogan, Yagoma and Magoliok, all of Tagoloan and of Maguindanao and Ditsaan (now Lanao del Sur) respected and feared him.

He was so well known that even Sultan Kabungsuan (also known as Sharif Kabunsuan, the youngest brother of Sharif Alawi) and other Muslim leaders visited him at Tikalaan several times to establish good relationship during the propagation of Islam.

During this time Mindanao, tribal wars were prevalent. The inhabitants in the coastal areas could not go up to the mountains for fear of ambush and killings; neither could the inhabitants in the mountains go to the coastal areas. Thus, in response to the request of the Muslims who were already well established in Maguindanao, Lanao, Sulu and Tagoloan, Datu Man-utob acceded to the call for peace among the rulers of Mindanao. He hosted a peace treaty at Tikalaan called TAMPUDA HA APAT HA PASAGI TA PUSOD TA DAGAT (a Binukid term meaning “Peace Treaty of Four Rulers in Central Mindanao”). The terms of the treaty was specific – to achieve peace for them to live in an atmosphere of justice and tranquility. Transgressors were dealt with accordingly. Further, intermarriages between their people were encouraged.

To mark this momentous event in history, a durian tree (Durio zibethinus – Bombacaceae) which has until very recently succumbed to old age and a species of rattan were planted and a gold cross, porcelain jars, a Koran, needles and some other items that were soaked in carabao blood were buried right on top of the spot where the treaty was held. A piece of rattan was cut into pieces and each ruler was given a portion to even make the event memorable. All of these are recorded in the "Sil-Sila or Sal-sila" of the Maranaos, the Skrit of the Maguindanaos and the Halads of the Higaonons.

Not long after the peace treaty in Tikalaan, the Spaniards came to Cagayan de Oro to establish their seat of government. Likewise, they came to Tikalaan where they gave the reigning datu a Spanish flag and a cabo negro cane. The Spaniards were known to be suppressive to people who try to thwart their imperial rule. However the inhabitants were subservient to foreign domination, hence, there was no known occurrence of any serious trouble between them.

Sometime in 1902, the Americans arrived in Cagayan de Oro. The American regime encouraged the people to participate in running the government thus, in 1904 Man Sayagnon was appointed 1st Mayor of Talakag. He held office at Patpat, which is now San Isidro and his term of office expired in 1906.

In 1906, Amay Tigsay was appointed Mayor of Talakag and he continued to hold office at Patpat until 1908 where Man Sayagnon was again appointed Mayor and was in office until 1910. In 1910, Jose Levanta, son of Man Sayagnon, was elected Mayor and was in office until 1918. It was Jose Levanta, who transferred the seat of government from Patpat to the present site of the municipal government of Talakag.

In World War II, Talakag appeared to have been occupied for virtually the entire war by guerrillas opposing the Japanese occupation of Mindanao. From June 8 to 29, 1944, the Japanese attacked the area. Lieut. Col. James Grinstead had his headquarters in Talakag and before a force of 500 Japanese and Korean troops could take the town, Grinstead ordered his headquarters burned. On June 28 the Japanese-Korean force left Talakag and the guerrillas moved back into town and re-established their headquarters there.

Geography

Climate

Barangays

Talakag is politically subdivided into 29 barangays.

Demographics

Economy

References

External links
 [ Philippine Standard Geographic Code]
Philippine Census Information

Municipalities of Bukidnon